The men's pole vault event  at the 1996 European Athletics Indoor Championships was held in Stockholm Globe Arena on 8–9 March.

Medalists

Results

Qualification
Qualification performance: 5.60 (Q) or at least 12 best performers (q) advanced to the final.

Final

References

Final results

Pole vault at the European Athletics Indoor Championships
Pole